Dimitrij Skolil is a retired Czechoslovak slalom canoeist who competed from the early 1950s to the mid-1960s. He won three medals at the ICF Canoe Slalom World Championships with two silvers (Folding K-1: 1957, Folding K-1 team: 1957) and a bronze (Folding K-1 team: 1955).

References

Czechoslovak male canoeists
Possibly living people
Year of birth missing
Medalists at the ICF Canoe Slalom World Championships